All churches are located in the Roman Catholic Diocese of Charleston which encompasses the entire state of South Carolina.

See also
List of Catholic churches in the United States

 
Charleston churches